Binodacarus is a genus of mites in the family Rhodacaridae. There is a single described species in this genus, Binodacarus brasiliensis.

References

Rhodacaridae
Monotypic arachnid genera
Acari genera